Şəlvə may refer to:
Şəlvə, Khojali, Azerbaijan
Şəlvə, Lachin, Azerbaijan